The Bearcat is a 1922 American silent Western film, now considered lost. It is directed by Edward Sedgwick and features Hoot Gibson.

Plot
As described in a film magazine, The Singin' Kid (Gibson) rides into town after a brief sojourn south of the border where he had been hiding because of an unjust charge. While employed as a "runner" on a ranch where he discovers a plot to mulct his employer. He frustrates the plan, exposes a trick that attempted to railroad him into jail, and discloses the worthlessness of Archer Aitken (Buckley), lover of the ranch owner's daughter Alys May (Rich).

Cast
 Hoot Gibson as The Singin' Kid
 Lillian Rich as Alys May
 Charles K. French as Sheriff Bill Garfield (credited as Charles French)
 Joe Harris as Doc Henderson
 Alfred Hollingsworth as John P. May
 Harold Goodwin as Peter May
 William Buckley as Archer Aitken
 Fontaine La Rue as Mary Lang
 James Alamo as Henry
 J.J. Allen as Jake Hensen
 Stanley Fitz as Cut Face
 Joe De La Cruz as One Eye
 Sam Polo as Pining Willis

See also
 List of American films of 1922
 Hoot Gibson filmography

References

External links

 
 

1922 films
1922 Western (genre) films
1922 lost films
American black-and-white films
Films directed by Edward Sedgwick
Lost Western (genre) films
Lost American films
Universal Pictures films
Silent American Western (genre) films
1920s American films